The leukocyte immunoglobulin-like receptors (LILR) are a family of receptors possessing extracellular immunoglobulin domains.
They are also known as CD85, ILTs and LIR, and can exert immunomodulatory effects on a wide range of immune cells. The human genes encoding these receptors are found in a gene cluster at chromosomal region 19q13.4.

They include

 LILRA1
 LILRA2
 LILRA3
 LILRA4
 LILRA5
 LILRA6
 LILRB1
 LILRB2
 LILRB3
 LILRB4
 LILRB5
 LILRB6 or LILRA6
 LILRB7 or LILRA5

A subset of LILR recognise MHC class I (also known as HLA class I in humans). The LILR family is a cluster of paired receptors with both activating and inhibitory functions. Of these, the inhibitory receptors LILRB1 and LILRB2 show a broad specificity for classical and non-classical MHC alleles with preferential binding to b2m-associated complexes. In contrast, the activating receptors LILRA1 and LILRA3 prefer b2m-independent free heavy chains of MHC class I, and in particular HLA-C alleles.

See also
 LAIR1
 Killer-cell immunoglobulin-like receptor

References

Immunoglobulin superfamily